Deodar is one of the 182 Legislative Assembly constituencies of Gujarat state in India. It is part of Banaskantha district.It is numbered as 14-Deodar.

List of segments

This assembly seat represents the following segments,

 Deodar Taluka
 Deesa Taluka (Part) Villages – Jadiyali, Bhadra, Nandla, Ghana, Bhakadiyal, Kotda, Dhunsol, Dhroba, Kherola, Pechhdal, Sarat, Kamodi, Deka, Vasna (Kuda), Jasara, Kuda, Chekra, Kamoda, Devsari, Zenal, Nani, Jhakol, Matu, Dodana, Moral, Lakhani, Vasna (Vatam), Manaki, Agthala, Chitroda, Katarva, Gamdi, Varnoda, Godha, Mota Kapra, Nana Kapra, Vakvada, Dharanva, Shergadh, Peplu, Taleganj, Balodhar, Gharnal Nani, Gharnal Moti, Nesda Juna, Nesda Nava, Ramvas, Paldi, Ratanpura, Soyla, Nava Bhildi, Bhildi.

Members of Legislative Assembly

Election results

2022

2017

2012

2007

See also
 List of constituencies of the Gujarat Legislative Assembly
 Banaskantha district

References

External links
 

Assembly constituencies of Gujarat
Politics of Banaskantha district